The Abyss of Repentance (Polish:Otchlan pokuty) is a 1923 Polish silent drama film directed by Wiktor Biegański and starring Antoni Piekarski, Ryszard Sobiszewski and Halina Maciejowska. The film was shot and set in the Tatra Mountains.

Cast
 Antoni Piekarski as Lesniczy 
 Ryszard Sobiszewski as Molski, father 
 Halina Maciejowska as Maria 'Mary' Molska 
 Wiktor Biegański as Ryszard 'Rysio' Molski, Mary's brother 
 Jerzy Starczewski as Narzeczony Marii

References

Bibliography
 Haltof, Marek. Polish National Cinema. Berghahn Books, 2002.

External links

1923 films
1923 drama films
Polish drama films
Polish silent films
1920s Polish-language films
Films directed by Wiktor Bieganski
Films shot in Poland
Films set in Poland
Polish black-and-white films
Silent drama films